Mount Kathleen is a peak about  high, being the central and highest summit of Ebony Ridge at the north end of the Commonwealth Range, Antarctica. It was discovered by the British Antarctic Expedition, 1907–09, under Sir Ernest Shackleton, who named this feature for his eldest sister.

References

Mountains of the Ross Dependency
Dufek Coast